Anti-Armenian sentiment or Armenophobia is widespread in Azerbaijan, mainly due to the conflict over Nagorno-Karabakh. According to the European Commission against Racism and Intolerance (ECRI), Armenians are "the most vulnerable group in Azerbaijan in the field of racism and racial discrimination." A 2012 opinion poll found that 91% of Azerbaijanis perceive Armenia as "the biggest enemy of Azerbaijan." The word "Armenian" (erməni) is widely used as an insult in Azerbaijan. Stereotypical opinions circulating in the mass media have their deep roots in the public consciousness.

Throughout the 20th century, Armenian and the Turkic-speaking Muslim (Shia and Sunni; then known as "Caucasian Tatars" , later as Azerbaijanis) inhabitants of Transcaucasia  have been involved in numerous conflicts. Pogroms, massacres and wars solidified oppositional ethnic identities between the two groups, and have contributed to the development of national consciousnesses among both Armenians and Azerbaijanis. From 1918 to 1920, organized killings of Armenians occurred in Azerbaijan, especially in the Armenian cultural centers in Baku and Shusha.

Contemporary Armenophobia in Azerbaijan traces its roots to the last years of the Soviet Union, when Armenians demanded that the Soviet authorities transfer the mostly Armenian-populated Nagorno-Karabakh Autonomous Oblast (NKAO) in the Azerbaijan SSR to the Armenian SSR. In response to these demands, anti-Armenian rallies were held in various cities, where Azeri nationalist groups incited anti-Armenian sentiments that led to pogroms in Sumgait, Kirovabad and Baku. From 1988 through 1990, an estimated 300,000-350,000 Armenians either fled under threat of violence or were deported from Azerbaijan, and roughly 167,000 Azerbaijanis were forced to flee Armenia, often under violent circumstances. The rising tensions between the two nations eventually escalated into a large-scale military conflict over Nagorno-Karabakh, in which Azerbaijan lost control over around 14% of the country's territory to the self-proclaimed Nagorno-Karabakh Republic. Ever-increasing tensions over the loss of the territory, which sparked more anti-Armenian sentiment.

The Armenian side has accused the Azerbaijani government of carrying out anti-Armenian policy inside and outside the country, which includes propaganda of hate toward Armenia and Armenians and the destruction of Armenian cultural heritage. According to Fyodor Lukyanov, editor-in-chief of the journal Russia in Global Affairs, "Armenophobia is the institutional part of the modern Azerbaijani statehood and Karabakh is in the center of it". In 2011, the ECRI report on Azerbaijan stated that "the constant negative official and media discourse" against Armenia fosters "a negative climate of opinion regarding people of Armenian origin, who remain vulnerable to discrimination." According to historian Jeremy Smith, "National identity in post-Soviet Azerbaijan rests in large part, then, on the cult of the Alievs, alongside a sense of embattlement and victimisation and a virulent hatred of Armenia and Armenians".

Early period
There have been numerous cases of anti-Armenianism in Azerbaijan throughout history. Between 1905 and 1907, the Armenian–Tatar massacres resulted in the deaths of thousands of Armenians and Azerbaijanis. According to historian Firuz Kazemzadeh, writing in 1951: "it is impossible to pin the blame for the massacres on either side. It seems that in some cases (Baku, Elizavetpol) the Azerbaijanis fired the first shots, in other cases (Shusha, Tiflis) the Armenians."

A wave of anti-Armenian massacres in Azerbaijani-controlled territories started in 1918 and continued until 1920, when both Armenia and Azerbaijan joined the Soviet Union. In September 1918, a massacre of the Armenians of Baku, now known as the September Days, took place, leaving an estimated 10,000 to 30,000 ethnic Armenians dead in retaliation for killing about 12,000 Muslims during the clashes of the March Days. Up to 700 Armenians were killed in Khaibalikend in a massacre organized on 5–7 June 1919 by Karabakh's Governor-General Khosrov bek Sultanov and led by his brother, Sultan bek Sultanov. As a result of the Muslim uprisings in Kars and Sharur–Nakhichevan, some 10,000 Armenians in 45 villages in Nakhchivan were massacred throughout 1919. In March 1920 a pogrom of Shusha's Armenians occurred in retaliation of the Novruz attack committed by Armenians against the local Azerbaijanis as well as the Azerbaijani army. Estimates of casualty figures are uncertain and vary from a few hundred to 20,000 victims. Before and during the Russian Revolution of 1917, anti-Armenianism was the basis of Azeri nationalism, and under the Soviet regime Armenians remained the scapegoats who were responsible for state, societal and economic shortcomings in Azerbaijan. During the Soviet era, the Soviet government tried to foster a peaceful co-existence between the two ethnic groups, but many Azerbaijanis resented the high social status of Armenians in Azerbaijan, as many Armenians were deemed part of Azerbaijan's intelligentsia. When the atrocity-laden conflict over Nagorno-Karabakh broke out, however, the public opinion in both countries about the other hardened.

During the First Nagorno-Karabakh War
The Nagorno-Karabakh conflict started with demonstrations in February 1988 in Yerevan, demanding the incorporation of Nagorno-Karabakh Autonomous Oblast of the Azerbaijan SSR into the Armenian SSR. Nagorno-Karabakh's regional council voted to secede from Azerbaijan and join the Armenian SSR. These events triggered the anti-Armenian riots that culminated in the Sumgait pogrom, during which 32 people, including 26 ethnic Armenians, were murdered. The pogrom was marked with a great number of atrocities – the apartments of Armenians (which were marked in advance) were attacked and the residents were indiscriminately murdered, raped, and mutilated by the Azerbaijani rioters. Looting, arson and destruction of Armenian property was also perpetrated. The Azerbaijani authorities and the local police took up no measures whatsoever to stop the atrocities. Russian political writer Roy Medvedev and USSR Journalists' Union described the events as genocide of the Armenian population.

After several days of ongoing unrest the Soviet authorities occupied the city with paratroopers and tanks. Almost all the 14,000 Armenians in Sumgait fled the city after the pogrom. In February 1988 at the session of Politburo of the Central Committee in Moscow it was officially acknowledged that mass pogroms and murders in Sumgait were carried out based on ethnicity. It was then that the academician Ziya Bunyadov, whom Thomas de Waal, a British journalist, calls "Azerbaijan's foremost Armenophobe" in his book, Black Garden, became famous for his article "Why Sumgait?" in which he blamed the Armenian victims for organizing the pogrom. According to Memorial, the thorough investigation of the massacre by Soviet authorities has not been made in a timely fashion and its perpetrators have never been held accountable for their crimes, which escalated inter-ethnic tensions. Those who participated in the massacre were hailed by numerous Azeri demonstrators as national heroes.

As time went by, the tensions between two nations grew rapidly, which resulted in new pogroms taking place in rapid succession. In November 1988, the Kirovabad pogrom was put down by Soviet troops, prompting a permanent migratory trend of Armenians away from Azerbaijan. In January 1990, Azeri nationalists organized a pogrom of Armenians in Baku, killing at least 90 Armenians and displacing a population of nearly 200,000 Armenians. De Waal stated that the Popular Front of Azerbaijan (forerunner of the later Azerbaijani Popular Front Party) was responsible for the mass pogrom, as they shouted "Long live Baku without Armenians!"

In July 1990 "An Open Letter to International Public Opinion on Anti-Armenian Pogroms in the Soviet Union" was signed by 130 intellectuals and scholars all over the world, which stated:

During the war, on 10 April 1992, Azerbaijanis carried out the Maraga Massacre, killing at least 40 Armenians.

Post-1994 era

From 1991 to 1994 the inter-ethnic conflict evolved into large-scale military actions for the occupation over Nagorno-Karabakh and some of the surrounding regions. In May 1994 a ceasefire was signed, but it did not definitively settle the territorial dispute to the satisfaction of all parties. The Armenian forces occupied large areas beyond the borders of the self-proclaimed Nagorno-Karabakh Republic (NKR), the question of refugees is still unresolved and Azerbaijan continues to enforce an economic blockade on the breakaway territory. The European Commission against Racism and Intolerance (ECRI), the Council of Europe's anti-discrimination watchdog, stated that the "overall negative climate" in Azerbaijan is a consequence "generated by the conflict over Nagorno-Karabakh."

Influence on Azerbaijani national identity 
The Russian historian and essayist Andrei Polonski, who has researched the formation of the Azerbaijani national identity at the end of the 1980s and the beginning of the 1990s, pointed out that "the Karabakh crisis and growing Armenophobia contributed to the formation of the stable image of the enemy which has to a great extent influenced the nature of the new identity (primarily based on aggression and victory)."

Vladimir Kazimirov, the Russian Representative for Nagorno-Karabakh from 1992 to 1996 and co-chairman of the OSCE Minsk Group, has many times accused certain forces in Azerbaijan up to the level of state authorities of inciting anti-Armenian sentiment. At the beginning of 2004, characterizing the decade following the conclusion of the ceasefire, Kazimirov stated:

At the 2009 Eurovision contest, Azerbaijani security services summoned 43 Azerbaijanis who voted for Armenia at Eurovision for questioning, accusing them of lack of patriotism and "ethnic pride", which was widely reported by international media.

In the media
The ECRI notes that the mainstream media of Azerbaijan is very critical of Armenia and that it doesn't make "a clear distinction between that state and persons of Armenian origin coming under the jurisdiction of Azerbaijan." It further implicates certain TV channels, prominent citizens, politicians, and local and national authorities in the "fuel[ing of] negative feelings among society towards Armenians" According to the watchdog, anti-Armenian prejudice is so deeply built in people's conscience that describing someone as an Armenian may be considered as an insult so strong that it justifies initiating defamation lawsuits, which in some cases is true even if the person who is called that way is an Armenian. There is also wide media coverage of some statements made by Azerbaijani public figures and statesmen which demonstrate intolerance. For instance, in 2008, Allahshukur Pashazadeh, the religious leader (Grand Mufti) of the Caucasus Muslims made a statement that "falsehood and betrayal are in the Armenian blood."

Indoctrination in schools 
The Azerbaijani historian Arif Yunus has stated that various Azerbaijani school textbooks label Armenians with epithets such as "bandits", "aggressors", "treacherous", and "hypocritical". He and his wife were jailed for allegedly spying for Armenia. 
Yasemin Kilit Aklar in her study titled Nation and History in Azerbaijani School Textbooks comes to the following conclusion: Azerbaijani official textbooks misuse history to encourage hatred and feelings of ethnic and national superiority. The Armenians... are presented as historical enemies and derided in very strong language. [The fifth grade history textbook by] Ata Yurdu stimulates direct hostility to Armenians and Russians. Even if the efforts to establish peace in Nagorno-Karabagh are successful, how can it be expected to survive? How can a new generation live with Armenians in peaceful coexistence after being inculcated with such prejudices? As of now, the civic nationalism that Azerbaijani officials speak of appears to be a distant myth or a mere rhetorical device.

Destruction of cultural heritage

According to the US Department of Justice:

Starting in 1998, Armenia began accusing Azerbaijan of embarking on a campaign of destroying a cemetery of khachkar carvings in the Armenian cemetery in Julfa. Several appeals were filed by both Armenian and international organizations, condemning the Azerbaijani government and calling on it to desist from such activity. In 2006, Azerbaijan barred members of the European Parliament from investigating the claims, charging them with a "biased and hysterical approach" to the issue and stating that it would only accept a delegation if that delegation visited Armenian-occupied territory as well. In the spring of 2006, a visiting journalist from the Institute for War and Peace Reporting reported that no visible traces of the Armenian cemetery remained. In the same year, photographs taken from Iran showed that the cemetery site had been turned into a military firing range.

As a response to Azerbaijan barring on-site investigation by outside groups, on 8 December 2010, the American Association for the Advancement of Science (AAAS) released an analysis of high-resolution satellite photographs of the Julfa cemetery site taken in 2003 and 2009. The AAAS concluded that the satellite imagery was consistent with the reports from observers on the ground, that "significant destruction and changes in the grade of the terrain" had occurred between 2003 and 2009, and that the cemetery area was "likely destroyed and later leveled by earth-moving equipment."

In 2019, Azerbaijan's destruction of Armenian cultural heritage was described as "the worst cultural genocide of the 21st century" in Hyperallergic, exceeding the destruction of cultural heritage by ISIL. The devastation included 89 medieval churches, 5,840 intricate cross-stones, and 22,000 tombstones.

Azerbaijani forces shelled the historical 19th century Ghazanchetsots Cathedral in Shusha during the 2020 Nagorno-Karabakh war. The cathedral was completed in 1887 and is the seat of the Diocese of Artsakh of the Armenian Apostolic Church.

Incidents of violence and hatred

In 2004, the Azerbaijani lieutenant Ramil Safarov murdered Armenian lieutenant Gurgen Markaryan in his sleep at a Partnership for Peace NATO program. In 2006, Safarov was sentenced to life imprisonment in Hungary with a minimum incarceration period of 30 years. After his request under the Strasbourg convention, he was extradited on 31 August 2012 to Azerbaijan, where he was greeted as a hero by a huge crowd, pardoned by the Azerbaijani president despite contrary assurances made to Hungary, promoted to the rank of major and given an apartment and over eight years of back pay. Armenia cut all diplomatic ties with Hungary after this incident. On 19 September 2013, President Aliyev stated that "Azerbaijan has returned Ramil Safarov—its officer to homeland, given him freedom and restored the justice."

In 2007, the leader of Azerbaijani national chess team, Teimour Radjabov, gave to a question on how he felt about playing against the Armenian team and he responded "the enemy is the enemy. We all have feelings of hate towards them."

On 4 April, during the 2016 Armenian–Azerbaijani clashes, it was reported that Azerbaijani forces decapitated an Armenian soldier of Yezidi origin, Karam Sloyan, with videos and pictures of his severed head posted on social networks.

During the 2020 Nagorno-Karabakh war, multiple videos emerged online showing beheadings, torture and mutilations of the Armenian POWs by Azerbaijani forces. A video showed two captured Armenians being executed by Azerbaijani soldiers; Artsakh authorities identified one as a civilian. Bellingcat and the BBC investigated the videos and confirmed that the videos were from Hadrut and were filmed some time between 9–15 October 2020. Another video showing two Azerbaijani soldiers beheading an elderly Armenian as he is begging for his life in Azerbaijani language by repeatedly says "For the sake of Allah". After the Armenian was decapitated, the victim's head was placed on the nearby carcass of a pig. The men then addressed the dead body in Azerbaijani, saying, "you have no honour, this is how we take revenge for the blood of our martyrs," and, "this is how we get revenge - by cutting heads." Human Rights Watch (HRW) reported about the physical abuse and humiliation of Armenian POWs by their Azerbaijani captors, adding that the most of the captors did not fear being held accountable, as their faces were visible in the videos. HRW spoke with the families of some of the POWs in the videos, who provided photographs and other documents establishing their identity, and confirmed that these relatives were serving either in the Artsakh Defence Army or the Armenian armed forces.

Denying entry to Azerbaijan

Unless a visa or an official warrant is issued by Azerbaijani authorities, the government of Azerbaijan condemns any visit by foreign citizens to the separatist region of Nagorno-Karabakh (the de facto Republic of Artsakh), its surrounding territories and the Azerbaijani enclaves of Karki, Yukhari Askipara, Barxudarlı and Sofulu which are de jure part of Azerbaijan but are under Armenian occupation. Azerbaijan considers entering these territories through Armenia (as it is usually the case) a violation of its visa and migration policy. Foreign citizens who enter these territories will be permanently banned from entering Azerbaijan and will be included on the list of people who are personae non gratae by the Ministry of Foreign Affairs of Azerbaijan.

In addition to those declared personae non gratae, several other visitors have been barred from entering the country due to their ethnic Armenian identity. Diana Markosian, a journalist of American and Russian citizenship, who is also an ethnic Armenian, was prevented from entering Azerbaijan due to her ethnicity in 2011. Zafer Zoyan, an ethnic Turkish professional arm-wrestler, was barred from entering Azerbaijan because his last name resembled that of an Armenian.

In May 2016, an eight-year-old boy with an Armenian last name was refused entry into Azerbaijan. Luka Vardanyan, a Russian citizen, was on a school trip to Azerbaijan from Russia. While at the Heydar Aliyev airport, the boy was detained even though his classmates were allowed past customs. After being detained for several hours, the mother, who accompanied him during the trip, decided to leave Azerbaijan immediately. In 2021, Nobel Arustamyan, a Russian journalist and football commentator of Armenian descent, was denied accreditation for UEFA Euro 2020 at the request of Azerbaijan.

"Azerbaijan 2020" stamp

On 30 December 2020 Azermarka, which works under the Ministry of Transport, Communication and High Technologies of Azerbaijan, issued "Azerbaijan 2020" postage stamps, which according to the Ministry, were dedicated to the significant events of 2020: the COVID-19 pandemic and the Second Nagorno-Karabakh War. Postage stamps were provided with an accompanying illustration showing a disinfection specialist standing over an Azerbaijan map and fumigating the area of Nagorno-Karabakh, seemingly depicting ethnic Armenians in the area were being as a virus in need of "eradicating". This has sparked outrage on social media and accusations of anti-Armenian sentiment.

Official statements
The 3rd president of Azerbaijan, Heydar Aliyev, in his speech pronounced on 13 October 1999, in Nakhichevan said: "In times of trouble, the people of Azerbaijan saw the help of Turkey and the Turkish people and is grateful for that. Particularly, in 1918-1919, during the struggle for independence under the leadership of the great Atatürk, who cleansed his land of Armenians and other enemies, the Turkish people and Turkey offered their help to Azerbaijan, to Nakhchivan."

Viktor Krivopuskov, who previously served as an officer of the Ministry of Internal Affairs of the USSR and a member of a peacekeeping mission in Nagorno-Karabakh gives the following assessment of Azerbaijan's current state policy: 
"The criminals are promoted to the rank of heroes, monuments are erected on their burial places, which comes to prove that the government of Azerbaijan actually continues the policy of genocide which was initiated at the end of the 19th and at the beginning of the 20th centuries."

Following the 2020 war, the Military Trophy Park was opened in Baku, showcasing the helmets of dead Armenian soldiers, as well as wax mannequins of them. Armenia strongly condemned it accusing Baku for "dishonoring the memory of victims of the war, missing persons and prisoners of war and violating the rights and dignity of their families". The Human Rights Defender of Armenia, the country's ombudsman, called it a "clear manifestation of fascism", saying that it is a "proof of Azerbaijani genocidal policy and state supported Armenophobia". Furthermore, in a resolution, the European Parliament said that the park may be perceived as a glorification of violence (by Azerbaijan) and risks inciting further hostile sentiment, hate speech or even inhumane treatment of remaining POWs and other Armenian captive civilians kept by Azerbaijan in violation of the 2020 Nagorno-Karabakh ceasefire agreement, thereby perpetuating the atmosphere of hatred and contradicting any official statements on reconciliation. The EU Parliament also added that they deplore the opening of the military park and urged its immediate closure, saying it would deepen the long-lasting hostilities and further decrease trust between the nations.

Statements by President Ilham Aliyev

On 28 February 2012, during his closing speech at the widely reported conference on the results of the third year of the state program on the socioeconomic development of districts for 2009–2013, Azerbaijani President Ilham Aliyev stated:

“Our main enemy is the Armenian lobby ... Armenia as a country is of no value. It is actually a colony, an outpost run from abroad, a territory artificially created on ancient Azerbaijani lands," Aliyev remarked in a micro-blog tweet while attempting to strengthen Azerbaijani government's presence on the internet, where dissident Azerbaijani bloggers and members of the Armenian diaspora often criticize Azerbaijan's human rights record.

Armenian genocide denial 
The Azerbaijani government officially denies the applicability of the word "genocide" to the 1915 Armenian genocide. The then-President of Azerbaijan Heydar Aliyev stated "In history there was never such a thing as the ‘Armenian genocide,’ and even if there had been, it would be wrong to raise the matter after 85 years." His son Ilham tweeted that Turkey and Azerbaijan are working to "dispel the myth of the "Armenian genocide" in the world."

Azerbaijani boycott of goods and services linked to Armenia or Armenians

Azerbaijan's largest airline, state-owned AZAL, had an Armenian woman named Mary Sargsyan, who worked for the Netherlands company Kales Airline Services and sold air tickets to AZAL, fired just because she was Armenian. On 8 December 2008, the management of AZAL appealed to the management of the Kales company with a request that the tickets should not be sold by persons of Armenian nationality. In its appeal, AZAL noted that otherwise cooperation with Kales would be terminated and an agreement would be concluded with another company.

Reaction

Armenia
In 2011, President of Armenia Serzh Sargsyan in his speech at the United Nations General Assembly said:

In May 2011, Shavarsh Kocharyan, the Armenian Deputy Foreign Affairs Minister, suggested a connection between the high level of anti-Armenian sentiment in Azerbaijan and the low level of democracy in that country, stating that: "Azerbaijan's leadership could find no factor to unite his people around the hereditary regime except the simple Armenophobia."

On 7 October 2008, the Armenian Foreign Affairs Ministry statement for the OSCE's Office for Democratic Institutions and Human Rights claimed that "anti-Armenian propaganda is becoming more and more the essential part of Azerbaijan's official policy." The statement blamed the Azerbaijani government for "developing and implementing large-scale propaganda campaign, disseminating racial hatred and prejudice against Armenians. Such behaviour of the Azerbaijani authorities creates a serious threat to regional peace and stability" and compared Azerbaijan with Nazi Germany stating "one cannot but draw parallels with the largely similar anti-Jewish hysteria in the Third Reich in the 1930s and early 1940s, where all the above-mentioned elements of explicit racial hatred were also evident."

The Armenian side also claimed that the Azerbaijani government "actively uses academic circles" for "distortion and re-writing of historic facts." It also accused Azerbaijan for "vandalism against Armenian cultural monuments and cemeteries in the lands historically inhabited by Armenians, as well as against Armenian Genocide memorials throughout the world" and called the destruction of the Armenian Cemetery in Julfa "the most horrific case."

Azerbaijan
Azerbaijan denies it is in any way propagating anti-Armenian sentiments. President Ilham Aliyev, when confronted with the allegations, started talking about Armenia's crimes during the Nagorno-Karabakh war instead.  The delegation of Azerbaijan to the OSCE Review Conference stated that "Armenia should not overlook that the most telling refutation of its mendacious allegations of Azerbaijan in anti-Armenian propaganda and hate dissemination is undoubtedly the fact that, unlike Armenia, which has purged its territory of all Azerbaijanis and other non-Armenians and became a uniquely mono-ethnic State. Azerbaijan has [a] worldwide recognized record of tolerance and peaceful coexistence of various ethnic and religious groups. This tradition is routed in the country's geographic location at the crossroads between East and West, which created opportunities for the Azerbaijani people to benefit from cultural and religious values of different cultures and religions."

Europe 
 – On 10 March 2022, the European Parliament adopted a resolution on the destruction of cultural heritage in Nagorno-Karabakh, condemning Azerbaijan's continued policy of erasing and denying the Armenian cultural heritage in and around Nagorno-Karabakh:"The European Parliament … strongly condemns Azerbaijan’s continued policy of erasing and denying the Armenian cultural heritage in and around Nagorno-Karabakh, in violation of international law and the recent decision of the ICJ...;Acknowledges that the erasure of the Armenian cultural heritage is part of a wider pattern of a systematic, state-level policy of Armenophobia, historical revisionism and hatred towards Armenians promoted by the Azerbaijani authorities, including dehumanisation, the glorification of violence and territorial claims against the Republic of Armenia...;deplores the fact that the conflicts in the Nagorno-Karabakh region have led to the destruction, pillaging and looting of common cultural heritage, which has fuelled further distrust and animosities.  – The European Commission against Racism and Intolerance (ECRI) published five reports on Azerbaijan and noted a general “negative attitude towards Armenians” in each of them. The ECRI wrote:“Political leaders, educational institutions and media have continued using hate speech against Armenians; an entire generation of Azerbaijanis has now grown up listening to this hateful rhetoric. Human rights activists working inter alia towards reconciliation with Armenia have been sentenced to heavy prison terms on controversial accusations”

See also 
 Nagorno-Karabakh conflict
 Anti-Armenian sentiment
 Armenia–Azerbaijan relations
 Armenia–Azerbaijan border
 Armenians in Azerbaijan
 Azerbaijanis in Armenia
 Anti-Armenian sentiment in Turkey
 Armenia–Azerbaijan relations in the Eurovision Song Contest
 Anti-Azerbaijani sentiment in Armenia
 List of conflicts between Azerbaijan and Armenia

References
 Notes

 References

Further reading
 A. Adibekyan, A. Elibegova. "Armenophobia in Azerbaijan" (2018): 261 p.
 Ebrahimi, Shahrooz, and Mostafa Kheiri. "Analysis of Russian Interests in the Caucasus Region (Case Study: Karabakh Crisis)." Central Eurasia Studies 11.2 (2018): 265–282. online
 Erdeniz, Gizem Ayşe. "Nagorno Karabakh Crisis and the BSEC’s Security Problems." (2019). online
 Khodayari, Javad, Morteza Ebrahemi, and Mohammadreza Moolayi. "Social–Political Context Of Nation–State Building in Azerbaijan Republic After the Independence With Emphasis On Nagorno Karabakh Crisis." PhD diss., University of Mohaghegh Ardabili, 2018. online
 Laycock, Jo, "Nagorno-Karabakh’s Myth of Ancient Hatreds." History Today (Oct 2020) online
 Özkan, Behlül. "Who Gains from the ‘No War No Peace’ Situation? A Critical Analysis of the Nagorno-Karabakh Conflict." Geopolitics 13#3 (2008): 572–99. https://doi.org/10.1080/14650040802203919
 Paul, Amanda, and Dennis Sammut. "Nagorno-Karabakh and the arc of crises on Europe's borders. EPC Policy Brief, 3 February 2016." (2016). online
 Valigholizadeh, Ali, and Mahdi Karimi. "Geographical explanation of the factors disputed in the Karabakh geopolitical crisis." Journal of Eurasian studies 7.2 (2016): 172–180. online

 
Armenians in Azerbaijan
Armenia–Azerbaijan relations
Nagorno-Karabakh conflict